Himesh is a given name. Notable people with the name include:

Himesh Choudhary (born 1990), Indian television actor and casting director
Himesh Patel (born 1990), British actor and singer
Himesh Ramanayake (born 1997), Sri Lankan cricketer
Himesh Reshammiya (born 1973), Indian actor, filmmaker, and music producer

Sinhalese masculine given names